Charlayne is a given name.  Notable people with this name include the following:

Charlayne Hunter-Gault (born 1942), American journalist
Charlayne Woodard, referrent of Charlaine Woodard (born 1953), American playwright and actress

See also

Charlaine
Charlyne
Charmayne James